The Peel Regional Police Pipe Band is a Canadian pipe band organization consisting of grades 2, 4 and 5 competition pipe bands based in Mississauga, Ontario, Canada.

History
The band was formed in 1976.

The band's senior Pipe Major is John Cairns; the senior lead drummer is Harvey Dawson. The band has been a frequent competitor at the World Championship in the grade 1 level from 2010-2017 and in the grade 2 level since 2018.

In 2002, the band accompanied Paul McCartney during his song "Mull of Kintyre" at a concert at the Air Canada Centre in Toronto.

From 2010 to 2013, Peel dominated the grade 1 field, finishing as North American Champions and PPBSO Champion Supreme in each of those years.  However, a string of successful runs for the 78th Fraser Highlanders in following years severely impacted Peel, and relegated the band to or near the bottom of grade 1 standings in Ontario, and the World Pipe Band Championships as well.

In 2017, the band was downgraded to grade 2 by the RSPBA after a dismal finish in Glasgow at the World Pipe Band Championships.  Band leadership soon embraced the idea of a teaching program, which promptly started competition in grade 5.  They achieved some success as the runners up to the Guelph Pipe Band, who won Champion Supreme that year.

The following 2 years saw the grade 2 band place within the top 6 at the Worlds.

Pipe Majors 

 Michael Grey (1995-1999)
 John Elliott (1993-1994, 2000-2006)
 Glenn Brown (2007-2008)
 John Cairns (2009–present)

Leading Drummers 

 Drew Duthart (2000)
 Doug Stronach (2001-2003)
 Craig Stewart (2004-2007)
 Graham Brown (2008-2012)
 Graham Kirkwood (2013-2016)
 Harvey Dawson (2016–present)

Recent achievements
Peel has fared well in grade 2 on the Ontario pipe band circuit, besting the 400 Tactical Squadron and Hamilton Police in the 2018 season.  However, they lost the North American Championship to the City of Dunedin, the grade 2 World Champions of 2018.

Their beginning ensemble began at the grade 5 level and qualified to compete in the grade 4 level in the 2019 season after a successful first season.
The grade 2 ensemble were Ontario champions and placed sixth at the World's in the 2018 season.

In the 2019 season, the grade 2 ensemble won the North American Championship, finished as PPBSO Champion Supreme in the grade and they finished in 5th place at the World's.  The grade 4 ensemble achieved a respectable finish in 3rd place overall.

Organization 
The band consists of a grade 2 senior ensemble, a grade 4 intermediate ensemble and a grade 5 junior ensemble.  Apart from the band are its teaching and development programs, welcoming anyone who would like to learn to pipe or drum.

Discography 

 Waulking the Beat (1997)

References

External links
The band competing at 2006 Kincardine Highland Games

Musical groups established in 1976
Musical groups from Mississauga
Grade 2 pipe bands
1976 establishments in Ontario
Canadian police bands